Parvatipuram railway station (station code:PVP), located in the Indian state of Andhra Pradesh, serves Parvathipuram in Parvathipuram district. It is one of the two railway stations in Parvathipuram.

History

Between 1893 and 1896,  of the East Coast State Railway was opened for traffic. In 1898–99, Bengal Nagpur Railway was  linked to the lines in southern India.

The  Vizianagaram–Parvatipuram line was opened in 1908–09 and an extension to Salur was built in 1913. The Parvatipuram–Raipur line was completed in 1931.

Railway reorganization

The Bengal Nagpur Railway was nationalized in 1944.Eastern Railway was formed on 14 April 1952 with the portion of East Indian Railway Company east of Mughalsarai and the Bengal Nagpur Railway. In 1955, South Eastern Railway was carved out of Eastern Railway. It comprised lines mostly operated by BNR earlier. Amongst the new zones started in April 2003 were East Coast Railway  and South East Central Railway. Both these railways were carved out of South Eastern Railway.

References

External links

Railway stations in Vizianagaram district
Waltair railway division
1908 establishments in India
Railway stations opened in 1908